Parvularcula bermudensis is a marine bacterium which was identified in 2003 in the western Sargasso Sea in the Atlantic Ocean. It forms a deep branch in the Alphaproteobacteria, distinct from the other orders.

Parvularcula bermudensis isolates are Gram-negative, strictly aerobic, chemoheterotrophic, slightly motile short rods with a single flagellum. Colonies on marine agar are very small (0·3–0·8 mm in diameter), yellowish-brown and very hard. They are oxidase positive and catalase negative.

References

External links
Type strain of Parvularcula bermudensis at BacDive -  the Bacterial Diversity Metadatabase

Alphaproteobacteria